Huggies is an American company that sells disposable diapers and baby wipes that is marketed by Kimberly-Clark. Huggies were first test marketed in 1968, then introduced to the public in 1978 to replace the Kimbies brand.

Products

Huggies carries diapers for premature babies, newborns, and infants, and they have variorities for daytime and nighttime. They also offer Pull-Ups, training pants for toddlers transitioning from diapers to underwear. Huggies also sells Natural Care wipes.

Pure & Natural Diapers were introduced in 2009 and marketed as an environmentally friendly alternative to traditional Huggies diapers. In 2019, Huggies introduced Special Delivery, incorporating plant-based materials.

GoodNites are a line of disposable diapers made for children and adolescents who wet the bed at night. They formerly carried the Huggies logo, but are now labeled simply as "GoodNites" and are no longer sold under the Huggies brand.

Gender specific diapers
In Australia and certain other countries, Huggies diapers are typically marketed in gender-specific versions for boys and girls.

Discontinued products

 Huggies Clean Team was a line of children's bath products and wipes, now mostly discontinued. The flushable wipes that were formerly under the "Clean Team" brand are now sold under "Pull-Ups".
 Introduced in 2004, Huggies Convertibles were discontinued due to leak problems.

References

External links

Kimberly-Clark brands
Unilever brands
Products introduced in 1978
Diaper brands
Baby products